The 1983 mayoral election was held to elect the mayor of San Francisco. Incumbent Dianne Feinstein, who had previously been subjected to a failed recall election on April 26 (winning with an 83-percent-favorable vote), was re-elected to her second and final term as mayor. Feinstein, winning with 80.10%, defeated Cesar Ascarrunz, Gloria E. La Riva, Pat Wright, Brian Lantz, and Carrie Drake.

Feinstein's strong victory in the recall election months earlier was seen as helping to ward off strong challengers to her reelection in November.

Results

References

1983 California elections
Mayoral elections in San Francisco
San Francisco
1983 in San Francisco